Sirius is a 1944 science fiction novel by the British philosopher and author Olaf Stapledon, whose title character is a dog named Sirius with humanlike intelligence. A sense of existential questioning suffuses the book, as the author delves into aspects of Sirius's psyche. The novel deals with many human issues through Sirius and his experiences, his unusual nature, his ideas and his relationships with humans. The characters go to great lengths to prevent Sirius from becoming a circus-type wonderdog, and instead, they seek to develop Sirius's character much like a family would create and foster that of a human child.

Plot summary

Sirius is raised by scientist Thomas Trelone in North Wales, near Trawsfynydd. Thomas embarks on a program of using steroids and other chemicals to rapidly develop cognitive power of dogs, resulting in super sheep dogs. Sirius, however, proves to possess a dog intelligence comparable to a normal human being, as he is able to communicate with English words, although it takes some time for the humans to understand his canine pronunciation. He is born at the same time as his creator's human daughter, Plaxy, and the two of them are raised together as brother and sister. During childhood, Sirius and Plaxy develop an intense bond for each other. Their physical and intellectual growth become a sort of competition, with Sirius striving to equal his handed sister. But as they grew, their relationship comes under strain, as Sirius develops a dog-like sensitivity to sound leading to a unique musicality, while Plaxy had a strong visual aesthetic. Their different sensory experiences afforded less interest in each other's experience of the world. Soon it was time for Plaxy to attend primary school, but Sirius could not attend. Despite his pleas to learn, Plaxy became reluctant to share her school and social life experiences with him. Their lives drifted further apart. When Plaxy departed to attend boarding school, Thomas wanted to bring Sirius to Mr. Pugh's farm, where he would work as a "sheep-dog apprentice" before taking him to the city, believing the experience would be beneficial to his character. However, Thomas wanted Sirius to keep most of his human intelligence a secret, with Pugh only suspecting him to be a "Super-super-sheep-dog." After a period of time, Sirius became desperately lonely and longed for his family, Plaxy especially. He yearned to write to her, and after weeks of difficulty and strings of failure, but gradually building upon his successes, he managed to write and send out a letter to her, without the aid of human hands. 
                
After a year being a silent sheep-dog, save for the holidays with Thomas and Plaxy, Sirius surprises Thomas by describing the psychological trauma he has experienced. Sorely realizing the insensitivity of his program, Thomas decides to show Sirius the university, where he marvels in awe. Sirius is acquainted with his creator's most trusted colleagues and scientists. They soon begin to study his mind and body. Months pass, and his new life as a pampered laboratory animal takes a toll on his physical and mental well-being, becoming overweight and agitated. After realizing his declining state, he arranges a meeting with Plaxy, now a university student. Plaxy, however, does little to console his feelings. After sensing her coldness and discomfort with him, Sirius is left feeling nauseated.

As they part for the night, an embittered and dispirited Sirius strolls through town. His mind floods with brooding thoughts of his own loneliness, analyzing the cruelty and hypocrisy of humankind, and the harshness of the universe towards all living things. Miserably depressed, lonely, and frustrated, he sought for an outlet to express the "spirit" within him. He develops a mystical idea of the perfect hunting, which is associated with his sophisticated sense of smell. The scent he pursues, the prey he's looking for is God. Sirius experiences a spiritual epiphany, seeing and sensing the world in a new light. He becomes instantly fascinated by human religion, realizing it had the answers he sought for, beyond the strict boundaries of science. His foster-mother, Elizabeth, agrees to take Sirius to a priest, Rev. Geoffrey Adams, who serves in the impoverished East End. Over a period of time, Sirius converses with Geoffrey, hoping to find the heart of spiritual truth and love, but is disappointed to learn that human religion has become lost in its doctrine and mythology. Fortunately, he discovers one outlet for his spirit, his feelings and life experience. After great persuasion to express himself, Geoffrey, with caution, allows Sirius to sing in his church — in front of an astounded audience.

When Sirius returns home, he mostly works as a sophisticated sheep-dog. But after seeing the destruction, death and misery of war, and mankind's stupidity, combined with his unique nature, which makes him isolated, he has a spiritual breakdown, and begins to indulge more and more his "wolf mood" which is irrational and murderously destructive. The final part of the story deals with his hatred towards humans and towards himself, and his violent acts. It also deals with the rumors of the rural community about Sirius' advanced nature being the work of the devil, and the scandal of Plaxy possibly having a sexual relationship with Sirius — which the novel's narrator, Plaxy's human lover, indirectly suggests that their love has a physical nature, but not directly sexual. Plaxy and Sirius have, during the whole tale, their political and personal issues, but also a very special bond, which leads to the idea of a mystical or metaphysical relationship, transcending ordinary love and understanding, which Plaxy refers to as a unique double-being, a 'Plaxy-Sirius.'

Eventually, Plaxy is conscripted during the Second World War. People continued to attack Sirius, and he subsequently sinks into deep despair. The hysterically religious population, who seek to vent their own fear and frustration with the war on an easy target, persecute Sirius with increasing violence, provoking violent responses by Sirius. Depression with what he calls the "tyrant species" cause him to abandon many of his more humane pursuits and live wild, killing many animals on their farms. One farmer and his sheepdogs venture out to hunt him, but Sirius kills the farmer in self-defense. Fear and rage rises in the town, solidifying their resolve to destroy him. Plaxy, after a desperate search, finds a terrified and feral Sirius, hiding from the townspeople. Plaxy manages to re-awaken Sirius' human mind, and tries to console him. But Sirius laments, realizing there's no place for him in the world, insisting that his human-needing spirit, and his wild wolf-side, made his nature fundamentally incompatible and torn. As they planned for their escape to Scotland, Sirius is hunted and eventually shot by the community. He dies professing his love for Plaxy, stating their life and time together, despite all the hardship, was worthwhile.

External links
 
 Full text online

1944 British novels
1944 science fiction novels
British science fiction novels
Fictional dogs
Novels about animals
Novels by Olaf Stapledon
Novels set in Gwynedd
Secker & Warburg books